John MacSween may refer to:

Eóin Mac Suibhne (fl. 1310), Scottish nobleman
John MacSween (haggis entrepreneur) (died 2006), Scottish butcher and entrepreneur

See also
John McSweeney (disambiguation)